Patrick's Day is a 2014 Irish drama film written and directed by Terry McMahon.

Plot
Patrick (Moe Dunford) is a 26-year-old schizophrenic young man, who goes missing in the middle of the St. Patrick's Day festivities in Dublin, much to the alarm of his English mother Maura (Kerry Fox).

Patrick goes missing and wanders around town. He meets a dog and gets a girlfriend. They hang out in a hotel room and his mom gets concerned about what happened to him. Eventually he comes back to his psych ward and gets back to normal. After this his mom makes it a focus to help her son get his mind in order. It is revealed that every person he met was not real and it was all in his head. He did leave the ward but did not meet anyone. He is put into isolation and is really upset he cannot see his girl. He goes through a withdrawal type sequence as the doctors and nurses hold him in place and get him to see the light. The movie ends with him walking around outside and feeling the goodness of the outdoors. He has accepted those were visions he experienced but his future is still unknown.

Release

Patrick's Day was premiered at SXSW on 8 March 2014. Throughout 2014 it was shown at many festivals, including Edinburgh and the Galway Film Fleadh. It went on general release in Ireland on 6 February 2015.

Reception and accolades
The Irish Times gave it 4 stars out of 5, calling it "a fascinating collision of psychiatric drama and state-of-the nation address." The Irish Independent, on the other hand, gave it 2 star out of 5 and criticised "McMahon’s tendency to write speeches rather than dialogue which people might actually use, something of a drawback when he appears to be going for realism".

Patrick's Day was nominated for nine IFTAs at the 12th Irish Film & Television Awards, and won three: Best Script (Film) for Terry McMahon, Best Actor in a Lead Role in a Feature Film for Moe Dunford, and Best Sound.

It was selected for entry to the Directors Guild of America's Directors Finder Series in 2014.

References

External links
 

2014 films
2014 drama films
Irish drama films
Films set in Dublin (city)
Films shot in Ireland
2010s English-language films